Karsten Friedrich Hoppenstedt (born 6 April 1937, in Osnabrück) is a German politician. He was a Member of the European Parliament from 1989 to 2009. He was a member of the conservative Christian Democratic Union, part of the European People's Party.

References

1937 births
Living people
MEPs for Germany 2004–2009
Politicians from Osnabrück
Christian Democratic Union of Germany MEPs